The Lake County Sheriff's Department is the county law enforcement agency for Lake County, Indiana.

History
The first sheriff was elected in 1837, when Lake County was organized.

Notorious gangster John Dillinger was held in the Lake County jail from January of 1934 to March, when he escaped. The sheriff at the time was Lillian Holley, who held the office after the previous sheriff, her husband Roy, was shot and killed: although the media mocked her for Dillinger's escape, the fault lay with the prison warden and his officers.

In 1975, the Sheriff was found in contempt for failing to improve conditions at the jail.

In 1985, Sheriff Rudy Bartolomei was indicted on corruption charges.
Bartolomei later turned state witness and was placed in witness protection after providing testimony against several Lake County political figures.

In 1990 the burned body of a deputy and his wife were found in a car in Gary, Indiana. The deputy was due to testify in a federal racketeering trial against a Merrillville town councilman.

In 2016, Sheriff John Buncich was indicted on federal public corruption and bribery charges. His chief deputy and another person were also named in the charges.

In 2021, officers of the Crown Point, Indiana police department began to pursued a vehicle for speeding well above the posted speed limit. The vehicle was being driven by Sheriff Oscar Martinez Jr., who activated the emergency lights on the vehicle, after which the police stopped their pursuit. The county commissioners soon sent a letter to the county prosecutor asking for an investigation into alleged misuse of county vehicles. In January of 2022, Martinez was indicted on charges of resisting law enforcement and reckless driving. Martinez called the indictment a "witch hunt" and ran for office in the 2022 election despite it.

Organization

The Lake County Sheriff's Department employs 168 sworn police officers, 170 sworn corrections officers and 156 civilians under the sheriff's direction.

The command staff includes a chief of police and four commanders, each responsible for a division, who are assisted by deputy commanders. The Corrections Division is led by a chief warden, an assistant warden and three deputy wardens.

Staff Services Division consists of the Bureau of Information, Bookkeeping, Human Resources, Property/Evidence Management, Telecommunications, Training and Vehicle Maintenance Operations.
Civil Division is charged with serving summons, subpoenas, evictions and writs of the Lake County Superior and Circuit courts as well as from other jurisdictions.
Corrections Division operates the Lake County Jail and administers the Work Release Program designed as an alternative to incarceration for non-violent offenders. The modern Lake County Jail opened in 1975 in a five-floor facility with 286 beds. In 1991, capacity was increased to 460 beds and additions in 2000 provided for a total of 1,085 beds. A Special Operations Response Team (SORT) is utilized in controlling inmate disturbances and restoring order in emergency situations.
Criminal Investigations Division comprises the General Assignment, Auto Theft, Special Victims Unit, and Warrant units as well as the Crime Laboratory and officers assigned to multi-jurisdictional task forces.
Uniform Division primarily provides police service to the unincorporated areas of the county and in the town of Winfield which does not have an established police department. This division also maintains an organized Bicycle Unit as well as a Traffic Unit which utilizes both patrol vehicles and motorcycles for enforcement and has trained accident reconstructionists. The Court Security Unit provides security at all county courts located at the Lake County Government Center and at facilities in East Chicago, Gary and Hammond.

The department also has a number of  Special Operations Units with specifically trained personnel assigned for Aquatics Underwater Recovery and Rescue, Aviation, Bomb Squad, Chaplains, K-9, Marine, Tactical (SWAT) and a mobile communications Command Center.

Aircraft
The Lake County Sheriff's Department has three helicopters used for law enforcement in the county and for assistance to local police agencies. They are maintained by the Aviation Unit and are operated from the Griffith-Merrillville Airport in Griffith, Indiana.

According to FAA records, the helicopters currently registered to the agency include a Bell OH-58A  a Bell OH-58A  and a Eurocopter EC120B

Demographics

Fallen officers
In the history of the Lake County Sheriff's Department, six officers have been killed in the line of duty.

See also

Lake County, Indiana
List of law enforcement agencies in Indiana
Sheriff

References

External links
Lake County Sheriff's Department
Lake County Government
Indiana State Police

Lake County, Indiana
Sheriffs' departments of Indiana
1837 establishments in Indiana